Kerenzen-Mühlehorn is a former municipality in the canton of Glarus, Switzerland.

It ceased to exist in 1887, when it was split into the three new municipalities Filzbach, Mühlehorn and Obstalden.

Former municipalities of the canton of Glarus